Alfred Christian Ludvig Jensen (since ca. 1880 Alfred Råvad, and in the United States Roewade) (10 July 1848 in Rådvad – 3 April 1933 in København) was a Danish architect and urban planner.

He visited his brother, Thor Jensen, an influential businessman in Reykjavik, and had to spend the 1915 winter in Iceland due to disruptions caused by World War I. He influenced urban planning in Reykjavík. He moved to Chicago and aided Daniel Burnham in the development of Chicago's urban planning.

References

Danish architects
1848 births
1933 deaths